Waverley Football Club, nicknamed the Panthers, were an Australian rules football club which played in the Victorian Football Association (VFA) from 1961 until 1987. Waverley wore red and black as their club colours and was based at Central Reserve in the Melbourne suburb of Glen Waverley.

History

Waverley Football Club
Waverley started out in the Caulfield-Oakleigh District League as the Glen Waverley Football Club, and in 1961 joined the newly formed VFA 2nd Division. They changed their name to Waverley to better reflect their representation of the region, and adopted the nickname Panthers in 1963. They started strongly, winning half of their 18 matches that year, and then in 1963 finished runners up to Preston at Toorak Park. The club was promoted at short notice to the 1st Division in 1964 to fill the spot left after Moorabbin was suspended from the Association. In its first season in Division 1, the club survived relegation back to Division 2 by winning the last game of the season against their nemesis from the previous season, Preston.

The club's breakthrough year came in 1965 under the coaching of Ian Thorogood when, despite competing in just their second season in the top division, they claimed the premiership with a 12-point victory over Port Melbourne in the Grand Final at Port Melbourne's home ground. The following season they met again in the decider, but this time Port Melbourne was too strong. In 1970 they finished third, but in 1972 the club finished last and was relegated to Division 2, ending its nine-year stint in the top division.

The club struggled for support in Division 2, and was also hindered by the opening of VFL Park in nearby Mulgrave, as many locals preferred to watch the VFL game played at the ground every Saturday than watch the Panthers on a Sunday. In the mid-1970s when Association-wide crowds were averaging more than 4,500, Waverley still seldom drew more than 1,000 fans to games. The club was runner-up in Division 2 in 1981, and earned promotion to the expanded 12-team Division 1 for 1982, but returned to Division 2 in 1984 after two wooden spoons at the top level. Waverley was Division 2 runner-up in its final season, 1987, then abruptly folded one month before the 1988 season due to financial difficulties.

Honours
VFA premierships (1)
 1st Division – 1965
Waverley 14.13 (97) d. Port Melbourne 10.25 (85)

J. J. Liston Trophies (2)
 Alan Poore – 1965, 1966

Notable players
 Russell Blew, Essendon dual premiership player
 Greg Brown, 1965 Essendon premiership team
 Alan Poore, had a stint at Collingwood
 Don R. Scott, inaugural VFA captain-coach
 Ray Shaw, Collingwood player and Copeland Trophy winner
 Kevin Morris, mercurial half forward flanker who went on to a successful career with Richmond and Collingwood Football Clubs
 Ralph Rogerson, South Australian and VFL state representative, Fitzroy (VFL) captain
 Alby Smedts, Footscry and St.Kilda

Post-VFA 
The club reformed in 1990 by merging the VFA club with the Clayton Saints from the VAFA and entered the Eastern Districts Football League and played there until 1998 when it decided to merge with the Mount Waverley Burwood Football Club to form the Waverley Blues.

Mount Waverley Football Club
Formed in 1924, the Mount Waverley Football Club played in the Federal League, then the Oakleigh Caulfield District Football League, and then the South East Suburban Football League. The club won a premiership in 1964. As the SESFL grew, Mount Waverley played all its games in its top division. The SESFL became the Southern Football League and MWFC continued in First Division until 1993.

Burwood Football Club
Originally called Burwood United, they played in the Eastern Churches Football Association until 1992. The club played in the South East Suburban Football League for one season in 1993. They dropped United out of their name when the name became available (the original Burwood merged with Essex Heights to form Ashwood Football Club in 1985).

Mount Waverley Burwood Football Club
The club participated in First Division in the Southern Football League from 1994 to 1997, until it merged with the Waverley Football Club to form the Waverley Blues. During the 1998 season, the committees of both the Waverley and MWBFC decided to merge the two clubs to form a new dynamic entity that would represent the Waverley area of the City of Monash.

Waverley Blues Football Club
The Waverley Blues participate in the Eastern Football League and have won premierships in 2001 (Division 4), 2005 (Division 4) and 2008 (Division 3). 
Notable VFL/AFL players from the Mount Waverley, Mount Waverley Burwood, and Waverley Blues Junior Football Club include: Bret Thornton, Chris Knights, Riley Collier-Dawkins.

References 

Former Victorian Football League clubs
Australian rules football clubs in Melbourne
Australian rules football clubs established in 1908
1908 establishments in Australia
1987 disestablishments in Australia
Australian rules football clubs disestablished in 1987
Glen Waverley, Victoria
Sport in the City of Monash